Whitbourn is a surname. Notable people with the surname include: 

James Whitbourn (born 1963), British composer and conductor
John Whitbourn (born 1958), English author
John Whitbourn (1885–1936), English footballer